The Stevens Award is a software engineering lecture award given by the Reengineering Forum, an industry association. The international Stevens Award was created to recognize outstanding contributions to the literature or practice of methods for software and systems development. The first award was given in 1995. The presentations focus on the current state of software methods and their direction for the future.

This award lecture is named in memory of Wayne Stevens (1944-1993), a consultant, author, pioneer, and advocate of the practical application of software methods and tools. The Stevens Award and lecture is managed by the Reengineering Forum. The award was founded by International Workshop on Computer Aided Software Engineering (IWCASE), an international workshop association of users and developers of computer-aided software engineering (CASE) technology, which merged into The Reengineering Forum. Wayne Stevens was a charter member of the IWCASE executive board.

Recipients 
 1995: Tony Wasserman
 1996: David Harel
 1997: Michael Jackson
 1998: Thomas McCabe
 1999: Tom DeMarco
 2000: Gerald Weinberg
 2001: Peter Chen
 2002: Cordell Green
 2003: Manny Lehman
 2004: François Bodart
 2005: Mary Shaw, Jim Highsmith
 2006: Grady Booch
 2007: Nicholas Zvegintzov
 2008: Harry Sneed
 2009: Larry Constantine
 2010: Peter Aiken
 2011: Jared Spool, Barry Boehm
 2012: Philip Newcomb
 2013: Jean-Luc Hainaut
 2014: François Coallier
 2015: Pierre Bourque

See also 

 List of computer science awards

References

Computer science awards
Software engineering